Henry Louis Stephens (February 11, 1824 – December 13, 1882) was an American illustrator and editorial cartoonist.

Art career
Henry Louis Stephens was born in Philadelphia in 1824. Around 1859, he went to New York under an engagement with Frank Leslie. After a year, he transferred his services to Harper & Brothers. Stephens was a prolific artist and accomplished a great amount of work for book and magazine illustration.

Publications 

Stephens was well known as a caricaturist, excelling especially in the humorous delineation of animals, and drew cartoons and sketches for The Cyclopedia of Wit and Humor (1858), a book edited by William Evans Burton, Vanity Fair (1859–63), Mrs. Grundy (1869), Punchline (1870), and other periodicals. He contributed artwork to Mark Twain's comic memoir, Roughing It and the novel The Gilded Age: A Tale of Today by Mark Twain and Charles Dudley Warner. He illustrated some children's books, including Aesop's Fables, Death of Cock Robin, and The House that Jack Built; he wrote and illustrated The Goblin Snob, a satirical poem, as well as The Comic Natural History of the Human Race (1851). He painted in watercolors, but rarely exhibited his works.

Stephens died in Bayonne, New Jersey.

Notes

References

External links

 
 
 

1824 births
1882 deaths
American illustrators
American editorial cartoonists
Artists from Philadelphia